This is a list of mammal species recorded in the wild in Newfoundland, the island portion of the Canadian province of Newfoundland and Labrador. Only 14 known species (and one extinct species) are or were native to the island; this list is divided into native species and species introduced to the island since discovery by Europeans and colonization in the late 15th and early 16th centuries.

Several species native to Newfoundland are genetically distinct subspecies of more common species found elsewhere in Canada and North America.

Native species 

 Northern long-eared bat, Myotis septentrionalis
 Hoary bat, Lasiurus cinereus
 Little brown bat, Myotis lucifugus
 Newfoundland black bear, Ursus americanus hamiltoni
 Newfoundland beaver, Castor canadensis caecator
 Migratory woodland caribou, Rangifer tarandus caribou
 Ermine, Mustela erminea
 Red fox, Vulpes vulpes deletrix, silver and cross variants 
 Arctic hare, Lepus arcticus bangsii
 Newfoundland lynx, Lynx canadensis subsolanus
 Newfoundland pine marten, Martes americana atrata
 Muskrat, Ondatra zibethicus obscurus
 Northern river otter, Lontra canadensis degener
 Meadow vole, Microtus pennsylvanicus terranovae

Extinct species

 Newfoundland wolf, Canis lupus beothucus

Naturally incoming species
 Labrador wolf, Canis lupus labradorius, apparent natural range expansion in early 21st century. There is no confirmed breeding population on the island.
 Coyote, Canis latrans, natural range expansion in the late 20th century
 Polar bear, Ursus maritimus, periodic appearances on the island in late winter or early spring

Introduced species 

 Eastern chipmunk, Tamias striatus, introduced in 1962
 Snowshoe hare, Lepus americanus, introduced around 1860
 American mink, Mustela vison, introduced for fur-farming in 1934
 Moose, Alces alces, introduced in both 1878 and 1904
 Deer mouse, Peromyscus maniculatus
 House mouse, Mus musculus
 Brown rat, Rattus norvegicus
 Masked shrew, Sorex cinereus
 American red squirrel, Tamiasciurus hudsonicus, introduced in 1963
 Bank vole, Myodes glareolus and/or southern red-backed vole, Myodes gapperi

External links 
 Government of Newfoundland and Labrador, Fisheries and Land Resources: Mammals Native to Newfoundland, Introduced to Newfoundland, Native to Labrador

References

Mammals
Mammals
Newfoundland